Since 2001, the ECE membership selects the Las Vegas Entertainer of the Year. Entertainment Consumers Exchange is a national non-profit organization for fans and their favorites in entertainment. 

Culture of Las Vegas
American performing arts awards